Charles Hubert Patrick Corrigan (May 22, 1916 — June 23, 1988) was a Canadian ice hockey right winger. He played 18 games in the National Hockey League for the Toronto Maple Leafs and New York Americans between 1937 and 1941. The rest of his career, which lasted from 1935 to 1949, was spent in various minor leagues. He was born in Moosomin, Saskatchewan. Chuck was the grandfather to Pat Dodson who played professional baseball for the Boston Red Sox.

Career statistics

Regular season and playoffs

External links
 

1916 births
1988 deaths
Canadian expatriates in the United States
Canadian ice hockey right wingers
Fort Worth Rangers players
Fresno Falcons players
Hershey Bears players
Ice hockey people from Saskatchewan
New York Americans players
Ontario Hockey Association Senior A League (1890–1979) players
People from Moosomin, Saskatchewan
Pittsburgh Hornets players
St. Paul Saints (USHL) players
Springfield Indians players
Syracuse Stars (AHL) players
Toronto Maple Leafs players